John Casablancas (December 12, 1942 – July 20, 2013) was an American modeling agent and scout who founded Elite Model Management. Casablancas is remembered for his development of the supermodel concept.  He is the father of The Strokes frontman Julian Casablancas.

Early life
John Casablancas was born in Manhattan, New York City, on December 12, 1942. He was the youngest of three children of Fernando and Antonia Casablancas, a banker and former model, respectively, and grandson of Catalan textile machinery inventor Fernando Casablancas Planell. His parents had left Spain during the 1930s to escape the Spanish Civil War, and the family subsequently lived in Argentina, Mexico, and France, among other countries. At the age of 8, he began attending Le Rosey boarding school in Switzerland. He continued his education at several universities in Europe without graduating.

Career 
After pursuing several career options, Casablancas was offered a job in Brazil by a family friend to work as a marketing manager for a Coca-Cola factory. After several years he returned to Europe and worked at an architecture company. In collaboration with a fellow Le Rosey alumnus, Casablancas founded Elite Model Management, a modeling agency, in Paris in 1972. He had previously run the Paris-based agency Model Agency Elysée 3, which he founded in 1969. Clients of Elite included Cindy Crawford, Naomi Campbell, Linda Evangelista, Andie MacDowell and Claudia Schiffer. Casablancas is credited for developing the concept of supermodel in the popular culture, turning models into celebrities that were featured in mainstream media. He was also criticized for his habit of having sexual relations with young clients. Casablancas was 41 years old when he started molesting  15 year old model-to-be, Stephanie Seymour, in a very public affair.

Grace Jones, in her autobiography, exposes Casablancas' racism and sexual harassment. He is quoted telling her “Trying to sell a black model in Paris, is like trying to sell an old car no one wants to buy.”

During the years that Casablancas ran the operations, Elite grossed over $100 million in annual model bookings. It also generated controversy, with investigative reporter Donal MacIntyre making a BBC television exposé which resulted in the resignation of two Elite executives. Casablancas gave an "unconditional apology" for their behaviour. A sales director sued for unfair dismissal and was awarded $4.3 million. The annual Look of the Year events (later Elite Model Look), at which young women could win a $150,000 modeling contract with Elite, were later criticised by The Guardian newspaper for providing an opportunity for Casablancas and other judges such as David Copperfield and Donald Trump to proposition contestants. In 2003, the Los Angeles County Superior Court dismissed a case of sexual abuse brought against Casablancas by a former Look of the Year contestant because he was not a resident of California.

Having sold his shares in Elite in 2000, Casablancas set up the Star System management agency and Illusion 2K, a cyber model agency.

Personal life and death
At age 22, Casablancas married Marie Christine from France. The two lived in Rio de Janeiro for much of their marriage. Casablancas had one child with Marie-Christine, Cécile, who was born in 1969 in France. The two split soon after her birth.

In 1967, he met Jeanette Christiansen, a Danish model and the 1965 Miss Denmark, as well as the first model Casablancas ever represented. They married in 1979 after the birth of their son Julian, who would become lead vocalist of the American bands The Strokes and The Voidz, in 1978. They divorced in 1983, as he was having a public affair with Stephanie Seymour, 15 years old at the time.

In 1993, the 50-year-old Casablancas married his third wife, 17-year-old Aline Mendonça de Carvalho Wermelinger, winner of Elite Model Look 1992 in Brazil. Wermelinger was close in age to Casablancas’s children, who were 22 and 14 at the time. The couple had three children: John Jr., Fernando Augusto, and Nina.

A resident of Miami, Florida, Casablancas died on July 20, 2013, in Rio de Janeiro, where he had been receiving treatment for cancer. He was 70 years old.

Media
 Casablancas: The Man Who Loved Women, 2016 documentary (81 minutes long) by Hubert Woroniecki.

References

1942 births
2013 deaths
American expatriates in France
American fashion businesspeople
American company founders
Businesspeople from Miami
People from Manhattan
Deaths from cancer in Rio de Janeiro (state)
20th-century American businesspeople
American expatriates in Brazil
Alumni of Institut Le Rosey
American people of Catalan descent
Businesspeople from New York City